The sixth season of The Real Housewives of Beverly Hills, an American reality television series, aired on Bravo from December 1, 2015 to May 10, 2016, and is primarily filmed in Beverly Hills, California.

The season focuses on the personal and professional lives of Kyle Richards, Lisa Vanderpump, Yolanda Hadid, Eileen Davidson, Lisa Rinna, Kathryn Edwards and Erika Girardi. The season consisted of 24 episodes.

This was the final season and appearance for Hadid as well as the final guest appearance for Armstrong.

The seasons executive producers are Andrew Hoegl, Barrie Bernstein, Lisa Shannon, Pam Healy and Andy Cohen.

Production and crew
The Real Housewives of Beverly Hills was revealed to have been renewed for a sixth season following the announcement of Brandi Glanville's departure and filming had commenced in August 2015. The full cast, premiere date and trailer were announced on November 5, 2015.

The season premiere "Life's a Pitch" was aired on December 1, 2015, while the twentieth episode "Who Do You Believe?" served as the season finale, and was aired on April 12, 2016. It was followed by a three-part reunion that aired on April 19, April 26 and May 3, 2016 and a "Secrets Revealed" episode on May 10, 2016, which marked the conclusion of the season.
Alex Baskin, Chris Cullen, Douglas Ross, Greg Stewart, Toni Gallagher, Dave Rupel and Andy Cohen are recognized as the series' executive producers; it is produced and distributed by Evolution Media.

A month prior to season six premiering, Vanderpump Rules After Show premiered on Bravo. The series is the second spin-off to The Real Housewives of Beverly Hills and also serves as the first spin-off the Vanderpump Rules. The series serves as a talk show which features discussions of the weekly episode of Vanderpump Rules with guests from the series who answer questions about their lives on and off the show. The talk show is hosted by Julie Goldman and Brandy Howard.

Also prior to the airing of season six, Bravo aired a special on November 22, 2016, titled The Real Housewives of Beverly Hills Uncensored. The special focused on the conception and drama of season one of the series. Along with all the season one housewives returning for interviews, it also featured interviews with the producers who revealed never-before-seen footage and talk about the behind-the-scenes drama.

Cast
Five of the seven wives from season four returned for the fifth installment.
Shortly after season five, it was announced that both Kim Richards and Brandi Glanville would not be returning as full-time cast member in season six. Glanville announced on her podcast, Brandi Glanville Unfiltered, that after much consideration she would be leaving the series as a full-time cast member to focus on her businesses. Glanville went on to describe her four years on the show as a roller coaster and complimented the series. Glanville continued to participate in season six as a guest star and went on to have a prerecorded video-message shown during the reunion. The video wasn't received well however host and Executive Producer, Andy Cohen defended the decision saying, "She was on tape for a minute-and-a-half or two minutes, they could respond or not respond, they all got the last word. Brandi didn't have the last word. So, you know, I feel fine about it."
Shortly after season five concluded it was reported that Kim had been let go from the series
following an arrest at the Beverly Hills Hotel for three misdemeanors; resisting arrest, public intoxication and battery on an officer. Kim later appeared on a Dr. Phil special discussing her relapse and recent drunken arrest admitting that she drank while the series was airing and prior to the reunion. Her son revealed that she also takes pills and smokes pot. Following Kim's incidents, she entered rehab and got back on track with her sobriety but the following month she was arrested again, this time for shoplifting at Target and was sentenced with 36 months of probation, 300 hours of community service and 52 Alcoholics Anonymous meetings. News of Kim's shoplifting arrest was addressed during the season. Kim appeared on season six throughout the season and attended the reunion.

With the departure of the two housewives, Kim Richards and Glanville, season six saw the introduction of two new housewives, Erika Girardi and Kathryn Edwards. In addition to the two new wives, Girardi and Edwards, former cast members Kim Richards, Camille Grammer, Taylor Armstrong, Adrienne Maloof, Faye Resnick and Glanville, alongside Bethenny Frankel from The Real Housewives of New York City would also make appearances in season six.

Edwards was born and raised in Wisconsin who quickly moved to Paris after being signed to Elite Model Management, shortly after graduating high school. Edwards went on to have a successful career as a model, appearing on several magazine covers as well as appearing in Nike’s first Just Do It campaign. Edwards also dabbled in to acting by appearing on Married... with Children, in the episode Dead Men Don't Do Aerobics. Edwards later moved to Los Angeles where she then married NFL superstar Marcus Allen, at O. J. Simpson's home. After eight years the pair got divorced, however several years later Edwards married another NFL superstar, Donnie Edwards. Edwards and her husband live happily in Brentwood where they involve themselves in many charity and organization such as The Greatest Generations Foundation, which is a non-profit dedicated to supporting America's war veterans. The pair often like to travel and spend time in Donnie's hometown of San Diego, where they own their second home. Edwards is also a lover of animals, travelling abroad and expensive shoes.

Girardi was born and raised in Atlanta, Georgia where she attended North Atlanta High School for the Performing Arts. At the age of eighteen, she left her hometown and headed for New York City with dreams of pursuing her passions for singing and dancing, later appearing in several film and television productions such as High Incident, Lowball and Alchemy. Two years after arriving in New York, Girardi married and had a son, however she later divorced the father and move to Los Angeles and waited tables. Whilst waiting table, Thomas Girardi, a renowned  attorney, frequented her workplace and the two fell in love and later got married. The couple reside in five-acre 1920s estate, in Pasadena. During her marriage Girardi developed the stage name, Erika Jayne. With the new image she had developed, Girardi went on to have a smash debut on the music scene in 2007 with her first single Rollercoaster, which went to number one on the U.S. Billboard Hot Dance Club Play chart. With her new found musical success Girardi has gone on to have a successful music career with a total of eight number one Billboard singles. She has also toured and has collaborated with Flo Rida and Maino. Girardi is also a huge supporter the LGBT community and in 2015 she was honored as the In News Ally Entertainer in the LGBT Ally Awards.

Synopsis
The Real Housewives of Beverly Hills season six begins with Lisa Vanderpump reveals that the Los Angeles Dodgers have asked her to throw the first pitch, for the LGBT game. Vanderpump invites A. J. Ellis to her home to practice throwing. Later, With her husband and Giggy's support, she attends the game and successfully throws the first pitch. Lisa Rinna meets with a producer of Oprah: Where Are They Now? at her house to film for her future appearance on the show. Eileen Davidson continues to work and attends the set of Young and the Restless where she practices her lines and gets her makeup done preparation to begin filming. Yolanda Foster continues to suffer with Lyme disease, and reveals she has been staying in her and her husband's condo as it's closer to her doctors. Foster opens up about the many procedures she has tried to help her healing process and the places she has visited for them. Despite dealing with her illness, Foster relishes in her children's achievements. Foster is visited by her close friend, Angie Simpson. Simpson is the mother to Cody Simpson, who is Foster's daughter, Gigi's ex-boyfriend. Kyle Richards meets Vanderpump for lunch after a day of shopping. The pair discuss the rift between Vanderpump and Foster and Foster's illness, saying they don't quite understand what exactly is wrong with her. Richards reveals she is working with Warner Bros. on a script about her life growing up. Richards reveals that her sister, Kathy Hilton, doesn't support the script. Richards continues to discuss with Vanderpump that she hasn't spoke to her other sister, and former cast member on the show, since last years reunion as well as discussing Kim's drunken arrest. Rinna calls Foster inviting her to her dinner than she plans to host, and Foster invites Simpson along. Foster reals that her husband, David Foster, is busy working which includes travelling. Foster opens up with her struggle revealing that if it wasn't for her kids she would lose her will to live. Davidson decides to redecorate her home by removing some of the clutter, inspired by Brandi Glanville's comments from the year prior. She opens up about the recent passing of her father-in-law, Dick Van Patten. The ladies arrive to Rinna's dinner and comments begin on Foster's lack of makeup. Richards speaks on her upcoming trip to Tuscany and looks forward to spending some time with Vanderpump and her husband, who are also going on the trip. After a coughing fit and sudden hit of fatigue, Foster and Simpson depart the party midway through. After their departure, discussions of Foster's health begins with Vanderpump's husband, Ken Todd, remarks on how ill and terrible she looked. Richards continues with comparing the difference between Foster's photos online and how she looked in person, while Rinna felt touched that she even attended.

Kathryn Edwards officially made her entrance to the series in episode eight at a charity event hosted by Vanderpump and Rinna. Soon after Edwards arrival, Rinna brings up the O. J. Simpson murder case due to Edwards' history with O. J. Simpson. Edwards reveals she has history with Faye Resnick due to Resnick mention her and her ex-husband ina book she had published decades ago. At Richards' BBQ, she confronts Resnick however there is very little resolution when Resnick wants to leave it in the past. With her dislike of Resnick, Edwards finds herself in a heated discussion with Richards' when she speaks badly about Resnick, who is Richards' close friend. Edwards hosts a lunch for the ladies at her San Diego home and after a deep discussion about alcoholism, Edwards opens up about her painful past. Edwards later receive a makeover by Girardi. Edwards visits Girardi at her home and the two bond. Girardi reveals her opinion on Vanderpump and shortly after the lunch Edwards takes the information to Vanderpump. After getting a hearing test, Edwards receives some good news that allows her to hear again.

Girardi, who made her debut to the series in episode three, visits her close friend Foster, who gets a medical treatment. Girardi reveals her double life with her stage name, Erika Jayne. Girardi enjoys a day in Malibu visiting Foster and her husband David. Girardi meets the other ladies, leaving them feeling intrigued and shocks them with news of her own plane. After news of people question Foster's health, she questions the integrity of their friendships. During a dinner at Bethenny Frankel's house, who's a housewife featured on Real Housewives of New York City as well as Richards' friend, Girardi finds herself in a debate with Frankel over branding after Frankel watches her music video. Girardi flies to Cleveland on her private jet to visit Foster after her surgery. Girardi relays the discussion Vanderpump and Richards' had at the BBQ to Foster. Girardi later head to San Diego to perform at a gay club and has invited the women along. Girardi later bonds with Edwards by giving her a glamorous, Erika Jayne styles makeover. Later at her BBQ, Girardi gets into an argument with Rinna over who really brought up the words "Munchhausen." Girardi invited Edwards to her home to bond and opens up by admitting her opinions on Vanderpump, but later Edwards informs Vanderpump of what she has said. Girardi is confronted by Vanderpump on what she said and now is very wary of Edwards and doesn't trust her after she learns that she has relayed the information.

Vanderpump enjoys Tuscany with her husband and Richards. During dinner with Richards, she is confused by some of Richards' family being uninvited, re-invited and not invited to Nicky Hilton's wedding. Vanderpump heads to Columbus, Ohio with Rinna to find the perfect mini-horse for her husband's birthday. Later, Vanderpump hosts a white party at her home, Villa Rosa, for Ken's birthday. Taylor Armstrong attends. Vanderpump invites Richards, Davidson and Rinna to her house and before Davidson arrive, Rinna reveals her opinion on Foster's health which leaves Vanderpump feeling uncomfortable. Vanderpump visits the veterinarian emergency room for her swan. Vanderpump heads to the Hamptons to celebrate being on the cover of Bella Magazine. Vanderpump has arranged a place to say for the women but is offended when the ladies, excluding Girardi, organize somewhere else to stay. Vanderpump is confused after Davidson reveals she was offended by her curiosity and questions on Davidson's marriage. Vanderpump takes a tour to a place her husband wants to turn into a new restaurant and i surprised to learn it's currently a sex shop. Later at Richard's BBQ, Vanderpump finds herself in a discussion with Richards about Foster's children and their health. After Richard' reveals Foster said they suffer from the same illness, Vanderpump says that their father, Mohamed Hadid, has said they're fine. During a lunch with Foster and Richards, Vanderpump is accused of not having Foster's back after Foster calls the two out on their discussion about Foster's health. Foster pulls out her children's medical records and request Vanderpump to read them but she declines as she doesn't need proof. Vanderpump is informed by Edwards that Girardi thinks she is "spinning a web." Vanderpump confront Girardi on what she has said, and Girardi completely owns it. Vanderpump is informed by Rinna that Davidson thinks she's manipulative and later three discuss it. During the trip in Dubai, Vanderpump is accused by Rinna of rewriting history of who brought up the discussion of Foster's health and trying to bring Richards in to it. However, Richards soon contradict Vanderpump's story despite saying they're friends and have moved on from it. Following the argument with Rinna, Vanderpump gets in to another heated discussion with Davidson who brings up Vanderpump's inquiries on her marriage again. Vanderpump claims Davidson is always having a go at her despite previously apologizing. On top of the Burj Khalifa, Vanderpump gives Davidson what she wants and apologizes.

Richards enjoys Tuscany and takes in the country side while driving around in a luxury car. She later reveals she has been re-invited to her niece, Nicky Hilton's weddings. More revelations arise about some of Richards' daughter and husband aren't invited at all. After arriving home from Tuscany, Richards learns of more bad news revolving around her sister, Kim. During a day at Vanderpump's house, Richards  is taken aback by Rinna's opinion on Foster's health which leaves her Googling what exactly the word means. Richards continues to be devastated by ongoing news about Kim. While in the Hamptons, Richard's opens her pop-up shop and hosts a book singing for Frankel. During her BBQ, Richards' discusses with Vanderpump about Foster's previous claim that her children also have Lyme Disease. Vanderpump reveals that their father says they're fine. At lunch with Foster and Vanderpump, Richard finds herself confronted by Foster on her conversation with Vanderpump. At Edwards home in San Diego, Richards is conflicted when Rinna reveals her opinions on her sister Kim. Struggling with her issues with her sister, Richards later meets up with friend, and former housewife, Adrienne Maloof to discuss her concerns. Richards sits down with her sister, Kim after not talking for nine months and the two have an emotional talk. On the trip to Dubai, Richards' is brought into the discussion between Rinna and Vanderpump about who initially brought up Munchhausen. Despite admitting to being jovial, they denied being a part of the talk of bringing up the "M" word.

Davidson visits Foster and is in awe of her health. Davidson struggles with getting her husband to help her balance her duties as a mother and her work. Davidson arrives to Vanderpump's house in the middle of discussion between Vanderpump, Richards and Rinna on Foster's health. Rinna reveals she feels guilt and Davidson suggests she talks to Foster about it. During a lunch with some of the ladies including Foster, Davidson references Rinna's prior comments in a mix-up of who said what. In the Hamptons, Davidson feels she was interrogated by Vanderpump on her affair with her husband. On the last night in the Hamptons, Davidson opens up about her history of an abusive relationship. Davidson heads to Italy here she spreads her sister's ashes. Davidson is disturbed to learn from Rinna that Vanderpump and Richards were the ones that initially brought out the talk of Foster having Munchhausen. Davidson confronts Vanderpump on being manipulative. In Dubai, Davidson brings up Vanderpump's interrogation and tries to explain to  her why it was an issue. Davidson continues to explain the Vanderpump's apology wasn't sincere. Vanderpump later apologizes to Davidson on top of the Burj Khalifa.

Rinna after a visit to Foster, Rinna is shocked by Foster's health and how much medication she requires. Rinna heads to Ohio with Vanderpump to find a miniature horse for Ken. Later at Ken's birthday, Rinna engages in a conversation with Armstrong about Foster and the contradicting images on her Instagram and Armstrong reveals she thinks it's a misdiagnosis. During a visit to Vanderpump's house, Rinna reveals to Richards and Vanderpump that she believes Foster suffers from Munchausen syndrome, which leaves the other ladies confused and shocked. Shortly after the announcement, Davidson arrives and Rinna reveals she has partaken in a discussion about Foster's health and feels guilty. Rinna feels uncomfortable after watching Girardi's music video, claiming them as phonographic and too sexual. At a charity hosted by Rinna and Vanderpump, Rinna runs into old friend Edwards and discusses her history. Rinna meets Foster to discuss the Munchhausen discussion where she is honest and reveals she had engaged in discussion that question Foster's health. In San Diego, Rinna is accused of throwing Vanderpump and Richards' under the bus after Girardi reveals their conversation to Foster. Rinna embarks on a mission to clear her name by working out who said what to Foster. At Edwards' San Diego home, Rinna reveals her dislike of Richards' sister Kim from the events that occurred last year. She later goes on to describe Kim's recent actions as disgusting which upset Richards. Rinna later defends herself at Girardi's BBQ against Foster over previous claims. Rinna is accused of labeling people. Rinna is shocked to learn that Foster is hanging out with Glanville and Kim, and reveals to Davidson that Vanderpump and Richards were the ones that encouraged her to bring up Munchhausen. Rinna also reveals that she thinks Foster is scary and manipulative. Rinna reveals her trust issues to Foster and questions her friendship to Girardi. Rinna also reveals to Vanderpump that Davidson think she's manipulative. During the trip to Dubai, Rinna expresses her doubts on Foster's health. Still in Dubai, Rinna accuses Vanderpump of rewriting the truth and brings Richards in it. The two argue about who really brought up Munchhausen and Vanderpump's attempts to throw Richards under the bus. After not seeing Kim for over a year, Rinna comes face to face with her and the two talk in attempts to move forward.

Foster continues to take measure to improve her health of removing all the metals from her teeth. Later Foster has Davidson and Rinna over where she shows them her medication, which leaves stunned by her condition. Foster gets a Vitamin C drip with support of Girardi. Foster prepares for a getaway by having Girardi over to her house. During a lunch where she integrated Girardi with the group, she addressing Armstrong's previous comments of question her illness. Davidson reveals to Foster that Rinna has also passed on information and feels guilty. Later, Foster opens up about her children, Bella and Anwar also suffering with Lyme disease Foster heads to Cleveland who undergoes surgery to remove her breast implants. While in recovery, Girardi arrives in support. Foster meets with Rinna who addresses previous discussions she has had. Foster explains the reasons for her photos online is to raise awareness. Foster is in shock when Rinna reveals that someone has claimed Foster has Munchhausen and is faking being sick. Foster attends a session of cryotherapy with Vanderpump and Richards and at lunch afterward Foster confront the two ladies on the two talking about her kids, but throws Rinna under the bus. Foster pulls out Bella and Anwar's medical records to prove them wrong. At Girardi's BBQ, Foster gets in to an argument with Rinna, still feeling hurt by her previous claims and compares Rinna to previous housewife, Brandi Glanville. Foster continues to condemn Rinna by accusing her of labeling people. Foster needing a break from the ladies hangings out with her two friends, and former housewives, Glanville and Kim, but Rinna has opinions on it. While all the other ladies are in Dubai, Foster stays in Beverly Hills and has a picnic with Kim and Glanville. News begins to circulate on Foster's divorce and she opens up to Girardi on her marriage for the first time. With her divorce, Foster changes her name back to Hadid and is known as Yolanda Hadid.

Episodes

References

External links

 
 
 

2015 American television seasons
2016 American television seasons
Beverly Hills (season 6)